NC Policy Watch is a North Carolina public-policy think tank co-founded by Chris Fitzsimon and the A.J. Fletcher Foundation.  The organization works in numerous public policy fields including issues of poverty, health care, mental health issues, transportation, and tax reform.

Policy Watch focuses primarily on state and local issues and regularly produces op-eds and other reports with regard to policy in North Carolina.

References

External links
NC Policy Watch

Think tanks based in the United States
Organizations based in North Carolina
Politics of North Carolina